Michel Teló (born 21 January 1981) is a Brazilian sertanejo singer-songwriter and actor. Before his solo act, he was a lead singer in various bands, most notably Grupo Tradição. His biggest national and international hit "Ai Se Eu Te Pego" reached number one in most European and Latin American charts.

Teló's artistic career began in 1987 when he made his first solo performance in his school choir, singing a piece by Roberto Carlos and Erasmo Carlos. At ten, his father gave him an accordion. At age 12, upon encouragement by neighbors, school friends, and his brothers, he formed a band, "Guri," which played traditional music. He was the band's lead singer and composer. Besides his love for the harmonica, Teló also took piano lessons for five years. He was also a dancer and played the accordion, harmonica, and guitar.

Grupo Tradição (1997–2008)
In 1997, Teló joined the band Grupo Tradição where he sang the band's biggest hits, such as "Barquinho", "O Caldeirão", "Pra Sempre Minha Vida", "A Brasileira", and "Eu Quero Você." In 2008, he left Grupo Tradição, and his final album with the band, Micareta Sertaneja 2, was nominated for a Latin Grammy in the Brazilian music category. He was replaced by Guilherme Bertoldo, but the band had lost most of its appeal due to his departure and soon members began to quit the band, not having enough trust in the viability of the band without Teló.

Solo career (2008–present)
 
Teló’s debut solo album Balada Sertaneja was released in 2009 by Brazilian record label Som Livre.
 It was produced by Ivan Myazato and had two charting singles: "Ei, psiu! Beijo me liga" and "Amanhã sei lá". The release of the live album Michel Teló – Ao Vivo earned him a gold disc and featured the single “Fugidinha,” which reached number one in the Brazilian Hot 100 charts. 

Throughout 2011, Teló played over 240 shows. According to Forbes magazine, Teló's Fugidinha Tour was attended by more than 17 million people, and Teló reportedly made $18 million alone in 2011. Teló has also released two DVDs, one containing songs from the 1980/90s and in collaboration with Milionário & José Rico, Bruno e Marrone, and João Bosco & Vinícius, and the other, entitled Michel Na Balada, which contained new songs. 

In 2014, Michel Teló worked with Prince Royce to create a Portuguese version of Royce's song "Darte un Beso". The pair performed it live together for the first time at the Premios Billboard Latin Awards ceremony in late April of that year.

International fame

In 2011, Telo released "Ai Se Eu Te Pego," which became popular when Brazilian soccer player Neymar danced to the song in a viral YouTube video. In the Spanish professional league, Marcelo and Cristiano Ronaldo of Real Madrid danced to the song when Ronaldo scored the first goal against Málaga on October 22, 2011. On October 29, 2011, Brazilian left-back André Santos danced to “Ai Se Eu Te Pego” after scoring the 2–2 equalizer in Arsenal's 5–3 victory over London rivals Chelsea. In the Superleague Greece, Simão Mate, Cleyton, Sebastián Leto, and other Panathinaikos' players danced to it when Cleyton scored the first goal against PAOK on October 30, 2011. Other players who have publicly celebrated to this song include: Adrian Mierzejewski, Marco Reus, Lewis Holtby, Alexandre Pato, Kevin-Prince Boateng, Robinho, Lucas, Maxi Rodríguez, Sebastián Coates, Marquinhos, Ricardo Laborde, Felipe Melo, Emmanuel Eboué, and Farid El Alagui.

Awards and nominations
Teló won the award for "Best Tormentone" at the 2012 TRL Awards. In April of that year, Michel Teló sang "Oh If I Catch You" at the Billboard Latin Music Awards, but he was not nominated for any awards.

In 2013, Michel Teló was nominated for seven categories for the Billboard Latin Music Awards. He won Song of the Year for “Ai Se Eu Te Pego.” 

In 2015, his compilation Bem Sertanejo was nominated for the 16th Latin Grammy Awards in the Best Sertaneja Music Album category.

In 2020, his album Churrasco do Teló Vol. 2 was nominated for the 21st Latin Grammy Awards  in the Best Sertaneja Music Album category. In the following edition, his album Pra Ouvir no Fone was nominated for the same category.

Discography

Studio albums
2009: Balada Sertaneja

Compilation albums 
2014: Bem Sertanejo

Live albums
2010: Michel Teló Ao Vivo
2011: Michel na Balada
2013: Sunset
2015: Baile do Teló

References

External links 

1981 births
Living people
People from Paraná (state)
Brazilian people of Italian descent
21st-century Brazilian male singers
21st-century Brazilian singers
Brazilian child singers
Sertanejo musicians
Brazilian composers
Sony Music Latin artists